Numerous castles are found in the German state of Thuringia. These buildings, some of which have a history of over 1000 years, were the setting of historical events, domains of famous personalities and are still imposing buildings to this day.

This list encompasses castles described in German as Burg (castle), Festung (fort/fortress), Schloss (manor house) and Palais/Palast (palace). Many German castles after the middle ages were mainly built as royal or ducal palaces rather than as a fortified building.

Eisenach 

 Wartburg
 Metilstein (Ruins)
 Eisenacher Burg (Ruins)
 Residenz und Stadtschloss zu Sachsen-Weimar-Eisenach (in restoration)
 Residenzhaus Esplanade (remains of the castle, restored)
 Jagdschloss zur hohen Sonne (requires immediate restoration)
 Eichel-Streibersche Villa auf dem Pflugensberg (restored, location of the Evangelischen Thüringischen Landeskirche)
 Schloss Boyneburgk zu Eisenach-Stedtfeld (in restoration)
 Schloss Fischbach
 Eichelsche Rittergut zu Eisenach-Madelungen (partly kepy)
 Schloss zu Eisenach-Neuenhof (restored, privately owned)

Erfurt 
 Zitadelle Cyriaksburg
 Schloss Molsdorf
 Petersberg Citadel
 Forsthaus Willroda

Gera 
 Schloss Osterstein
 Schloss Tinz (once Wasserschloss)

Jena 
 Kunitzburg (Gleißburg/Burg Gleißberg)
 Ruine Lobdeburg
 Untere Lobdeburg
 Schloss Talstein

Weimar 

 Schloss Weimar
 Schloss Belvedere
 Schloss Tiefurt
 Gelbes Schloss
 Grünes Schloss with Herzogin-Anna-Amalia-Bibliothek
 Rotes Schloss

Landkreis Altenburger Land 

 Schloss Altenburg, Altenburg
 Schloss Ehrenberg, Altenburg
 Schloß Poschwitz, Altenburg
 Wasserschloss Dobitschen, Dobitschen
 Schlößchen Tannenfeld, Löbichau
 Schloß Ponitz, Ponitz
 Burg Posterstein, Posterstein
 Wasserschloß Windischleuba, Windischleuba

Landkreis Eichsfeld 
		
 Burgruine Altenstein, Asbach-Sickenberg
 Burg Westernhagen, Berlingerode
 Burg Hanstein, Bornhagen
 Hasenburg (Buhla), Buhla
 Schloss Buhla, Buhla
 Wasserburg Deuna, Deuna
 Burgruine Greifenstein, Geismar
 Burg Großbodungen, Großbodungen
 Steinernes Haus, Haynrode
 Haarburg, Haynrode
 Mainzer Schloss, Heilbad Heiligenstadt
 Burg Bodenstein, Leinefelde-Worbis
 Burg Scharfenstein, Leinefelde-Worbis
 Burgruine Rusteberg, Marth
 Schloss Rusteberg, Marth
 Schloss Martinfeld, Schimberg
 Burg Gleichenstein, Wachstedt

Landkreis Gotha 
 Schloss Fischbach, Emsetal
 Burgruine Winterstein, Emsetal
 Schloss Reinhardsbrunn, Friedrichroda
 Schloss Friedrichswerth, Friedrichswerth
 Schloss Georgenthal, Georgenthal
 Schloss Friedenstein, Gotha
 Schloss Friedrichsthal, Gotha
 Schloss Mönchshof, Gotha
 Burgruine Schwarzwald (Käfernburg), Luisenthal
 Mühlburg, Mühlberg
 Schloss Ehrenstein, Ohrdruf
 Kettenburg, Tonna
 Altes Schloss, Schwabhausen
 Burg Gleichen, Wandersleben
 Schloss Tenneberg, Waltershausen

Landkreis Greiz 
 Sommerpalais Greiz, Greiz
 Oberes Schloss Greiz, Greiz
 Unteres Schloss Greiz, Greiz
 Schloss Dölau, Greiz
 Burg Pöllnitz, Harth-Pöllnitz
 Burg Reichenfels, Hohenleuben
 Osterburg, Weida

Landkreis Hildburghausen 

 Veste Heldburg, Bad Colberg-Heldburg
 Osterburg, Henfstädt
 Schloss Bertholdsburg, Schleusingen
 Burgruine Straufhain, Straufhain

Ilm-Kreis 

 Alteburg, Arnstadt
 Käfernburg, Arnstadt
 Schloss Neideck, Arnstadt
 Neues Palais, Arnstadt
 Schloss Elgersburg, Elgersburg
 Raubschloss, Gräfenroda
 Burg Ehrenstein, Ilmtal
 Wasserburg Grossliebringen, Ilmtal
 Wasserburg, Ilmenau
 Burg Liebenstein, Liebenstein
 Ehrenburg, Plaue
 Burgruine Reinsburg, Wipfratal
 Schloss Stadtilm, Stadtilm
 Wachsenburg Castle, Amt Wachsenburg

Kyffhäuserkreis 

 Schloss Bad Frankenhausen (Unterburg), Bad Frankenhausen
 Oberburg, Bad Frankenhausen
 Schloss Bendeleben, Bendeleben
 Schloss Clingen, Clingen
 Schloss Ebeleben, Ebeleben
 Schloss Grüningen, Greußen
 Keula Water Castle, Helbedündorf
 Heldrungen Castle, Heldrungen
 Obere Sachsenburg, Oldisleben
 Untere Sachsenburg (Hakenburg), Oldisleben
 Schloss Rottleben, Rottleben
 Falkenburg, Rottleben
 Burg Straußberg, Schernberg
 Arnsburg (Burg) Arensburg, Seega
 Sondershausen Palace, Sondershausen
 Prinzenpalais, Sondershausen
 Jagdschloss "Zum Possen", Sondershausen
 Burg Spatenberg, Sondershausen
 Burg Furra, Sondershausen
 Jagdschloss Rathsfeld, Steinthaleben
 Kyffhausen Castle, Steinthaleben
 Burg Rothenburg, Steinthaleben
 Funkenburg, Westgreußen
 Burg Rabenswalde, Wiehe
 Schloss Wiehe, Wiehe

Landkreis Nordhausen 
 Humboldtsches Schloss, Auleben
 Lohra Castle, Großlohra
 Schloss Hainrode, Hainrode
 Ebersburg (Harz), Herrmannsacker
 Schloss Heringen, Heringen/Helme
 Ilburg, Ilfeld
 Hohnstein Castle, Neustadt/Harz
 Heinrichsburg, Neustadt/Harz
 Wasserschloss "Blauer Hof", Niedergebra
 Schloss "Hue de Grais", Wolkramshausen

Saale-Holzland-Kreis 
 Camburg Castle, Camburg
 Schloss Crossen, Crossen an der Elster
 Reichsburg Dornburg, Dornburg / Saale
 Renaissance-Schloss Dornburg, Dornburg/Saale
 Rokoko-Schloss Dornburg, Dornburg/Saale
 Christianenburg, Eisenberg
 Schloss Frauenprießnitz, Frauenprießnitz
 Wasserburg Lehesten, Lehesten
 Orlamünde Castle, Orlamünde
 Kemenate Reinstädt, Reinstädt
 Leuchtenburg, Seitenroda
 Schkölen Castle, Schkölen
 Jagdschloss Fröhliche Wiederkunft, Trockenborn-Wolfersdorf
 Burgruine Tautenburg, Tautenburg

Saale-Orla-Kreis 

 Ranis Castle, Ranis
 Triptis Castle, Triptis
 Schlossruine Wernburg, Wernburg
Schloß Burgk, Burgk

Landkreis Saalfeld-Rudolstadt 
 Greifenstein Castle, Bad Blankenburg
 Schloss Heidecksburg, Rudolstadt
 Schloss Hirschhügel
 Schloss Kochberg, Großkochberg
 Könitz Castle, Unterwellenborn
 Jagdschloss Paulinzella, Rottenbach
 Burgruine Schauenforst, Uhlstädt-Kirchhasel
 Hoher Schwarm, Saalfeld / Saale
 Schloss Schwarzburg, Schwarzburg
 Weißenburg, Uhlstädt-Kirchhasel

Landkreis Schmalkalden-Meiningen 

 Burg Bibra, Bibra
 Schloss Elisabethenburg, Meiningen
 Burgruine Hallenburg, Steinbach-Hallenberg
 Burg Henneberg, Henneberg
 Johanniterburg, Kühndorf
 Schloss Landsberg, Meiningen
 Burgruine Marienluft, Wasungen
 Wasserschloss, Schwarza
 Schloss Wilhelmsburg, Schmalkalden

Landkreis Sömmerda 
 Schloss Beichlingen, Beichlingen
 Schloss Eckstedt, Eckstedt
 Schloss Gebesee, Gebesee
 Schloss Kannawurf, Kannawurf
 Wasserburg Markvippach, Markvippach
 Wasserschloss Ostramondra, Ostramondra
 Raspenburg, Rastenberg
 Runneburg, Weißensee
 Burgruine Teutleben, Eßleben-Teutleben
 Wasserburg Ollendorf, Ollendorf

Landkreis Sonneberg 
 Schloss Niederlind, Sonneberg

Unstrut-Hainich-Kreis 

 Schloss Altengottern, Altengottern
 Schloss Bischofstein, Lengenfeld unterm Stein
 Dryburg, Bad Langensalza
 Friederikenschlößchen, Bad Langensalza
 Schloss Goldacker, Weberstedt
 Schlossruine Herbsleben, Herbsleben
 Schloss Neunheilingen, Neunheilingen
 Schloss Schlotheim, Schlotheim
 Burg Seebach, Seebach
 Sommerfeldsches Schloss, Großvargula
 Burg Stein, Lengenfeld unterm Stein
 Burgruine Thamsbrück, Bad Langensalza
 Burgruine Ufhoven, Bad Langensalza

Wartburgkreis 

 Schloss Altenstein, Bad Liebenstein
 Burgruine Altenstein, Bad Liebenstein
 Burgruine Liebenstein, Bad Liebenstein
 Ruine Brandenburg, Gerstungen
 Burg Creuzburg, Creuzburg
 Schloss Glücksbrunn, Schweina
 Burgruine Haineck, Nazza
 Burg Normannstein, Treffurt
 Burgstelle Bocksberg, Schleid (Rhön)
 Graues Schloss, Mihla
 Rotes Schloss, Mihla
 Scharfenburg, Ruhla
 Schloss Tüngeda, Behringen
 Schloss Behringen, Behringen

Landkreis Weimarer Land 

 Altes Schloss, Bad Berka
 Burg Apolda, Apolda
 Schloss Blankenhain, Blankenhain
 Felsenburg Buchfart, Buchfart
 Schloss Denstedt (Altes Schloss), Kromsdorf
 Schloss Ettersburg, Ettersburg
 Wasserburg Kapellendorf, Kapellendorf
 Niedernburg Kranichfeld, Kranichfeld
 Oberschloss Kranichfeld, Kranichfeld
 Wasserburg Liebstedt, Liebstedt
 Schloss Kromsdorf, Kromsdorf
 Wasserburg Niederroßla, Niederroßla
 Schloss Oßmannstedt, Oßmannstedt
 Burg Tannroda, Tannroda
 Schloss Tonndorf, Tonndorf

See also 
List of castles
List of castles in Germany